Edward Samoilovich Kuznetsov (born 29 January 1939) is a Soviet-Israeli dissident, refusenik, journalist, and writer. One of the leaders of the 1970 Dymshits–Kuznetsov hijacking affair, Kuznetsov's case drew international attention following his death sentence. As a result of global protests, his sentence was commuted to fifteen years' imprisonment.

Dymshits was released in 1979 as part of a prisoner exchange between the Soviet Union and the United States, and he subsequently made aliyah to Israel. Throughout the 1980s, Kuznetsov participated in the operations of Radio Free Europe/Radio Liberty before beginning the publication of the Russian-language Vesti in 1992. Kuznetsov is also a writer, having written three novels (two of which were written during his prison sentence and smuggled out of the country).

Samizdat and dissident activity
Kuznetsov was born in 1939. He studied at the philosophy department of Moscow State University.

While at university, Kuznetsov became involved with the first unsanctioned samizdat (self-published) magazines. In 1958-61, he co-edited the underground literary journals Sintaksis and Boomerang, and helped compile the samizdat poetry anthology Phoenix.

In 1961, Kuznetsov was arrested and tried for the first time for his involvement in publishing samizdat, and for making overtly political speeches in poetry readings at Mayakovsky Square in central Moscow. Among those also attending these informal gatherings were Yuri Galanskov, Vladimir Osipov and Vladimir Bukovsky. Kuznetsov was sentenced to seven years imprisonment.

Dymshits–Kuznetsov hijacking affair and aliyah 
Following his release in 1968, Kuznetsov became one of the primary organisers of the Dymshits–Kuznetsov hijacking affair in June 1970, alongside Mark Dymshits. Arrested for "high treason," he was set to be executed, but after lodging an appeal and international protests, his sentence was replaced with fifteen years in prison and labour camp. His case "opened the doors of emigration to thousands of Soviet Jews." In the 1970s, Kuznetsov shared a prison cell with Danylo Shumuk for five years.

In 1979, he and four other dissidents (Dymshits, Baptist preacher Georgi Vins, samizdat writer Alexander Ginzburg, and Ukrainian nationalist Valentyn Moroz) were exchanged for two Soviet spies arrested in the United States. Kuznetsov then immigrated to Israel.

Literary and other activities
From 1983 to 1990, he was chief of the news department of Radio Liberty in Munich. In 1992 he co-founded the Israeli Russian-language newspaper, Vesti (The News), which he edited until 1999.

Kuznetsov is a member of the PEN Club and has been widely published in European, US and Israeli media. He is the author of three novels: Prison Diary (1973), Mordovian Marathon (1979) (both written secretly in prison and smuggled abroad) and Russian Romance (1984). All three have been translated into many languages. In 1974, Prison Diary won the Gulliver Award in France, being declared the best book written by a foreign author.

In 2005, Kuznetsov participated in "They Chose Freedom", a four-part television documentary on the history of the Soviet dissident movement. He currently lives in Jerusalem, Israel and is a board member of the Gratitude Fund, an organisation supplying financial aid to former Soviet dissidents.

Notes

Bibliography

External links
 Edward Kuznetsov biography at The Gratitude Fund
   "OPERATION WEDDING" A documentary film by Anat Zalmanson-Kuznetsov
 Edward Kuznetsov biography at "Gulag authors and their memoirs", Sakharov Centre (in Russian)
  Interview with the "Memorial" society
  Interview at Sem40
  Biography and books at Belousenko library

1939 births
Living people
Moscow State University alumni
Soviet Jews
Writers from Moscow
Soviet dissidents
Soviet expellees
Soviet emigrants to Israel
Soviet prisoners and detainees
Naturalized citizens of Israel
Israeli people of Russian descent
Israeli people of Russian-Jewish descent
Israeli newspaper editors